The Skull is a 1965 British horror film directed by Freddie Francis for Amicus Productions, and starring the frequently paired horror actors Peter Cushing and Christopher Lee, alongside Patrick Wymark, Jill Bennett, Nigel Green, Patrick Magee and Peter Woodthorpe.

It was one of a number of British horror films of the sixties to be scored by avant-garde composer Elisabeth Lutyens, including several others for Amicus. The script was written by Milton Subotsky, from a short story by Robert Bloch, "The Skull of the Marquis de Sade".

Plot
In the 19th century, a phrenologist robs the grave of the recently buried Marquis de Sade. He takes the Marquis's severed head and sets about boiling it to remove its flesh, leaving the skull. Before the task is done, Pierre meets an unseen and horrific death.

In modern-day London, Christopher Maitland (Peter Cushing), a collector and writer on the occult, is offered the skull by Marco, an unscrupulous dealer in antiques and curiosities. Maitland learns that the skull has been stolen from Sir Matthew Phillips (Christopher Lee), a friend and fellow collector. Sir Matthew, however, does not want to recover it, having escaped its evil influence. He warns Maitland of its powers. At his sleazy lodgings, Marco dies in mysterious circumstances. Maitland finds his body and takes possession of the skull. He in turns falls victim as the skull drives him to hallucinations, madness and death.

Cast
 Peter Cushing as Dr. Christopher Maitland
 Patrick Wymark as Anthony Marco
 Christopher Lee as Sir Matthew Phillips
 Jill Bennett as Jane Maitland
 Nigel Green as Inspector Wilson
 Patrick Magee as Police Surgeon
 Peter Woodthorpe as Bert Travers, Marco's Landlord
 Michael Gough as Auctioneer
 George Coulouris as Dr. Londe
 April Olrich as French Girl
 Maurice Good as Pierre, Phrenologist

Production
The film was an attempt by Amicus to challenge Hammer Film Productions by making a full length colour movie. Once filming started, Freddie Francis rewrote much of Subotsky's script.

Christopher Lee is billed as "guest star" in the film's credits; he plays a supporting role, and, unusually, is not a villain.

The film's final twenty-five minutes contain almost no dialogue.

In real life the Marquis de Sade's body was exhumed from its grave in the grounds of the lunatic asylum at Charenton, where he died in 1814, and his skull was removed for phrenological analysis. It was subsequently lost, and its fate remains unknown.

Release

When it was released in France, promotional materials had to be changed at the last minute by pasting a new title, Le crâne maléfique ("The Evil Skull"), over the original French title Les Forfaits du Marquis de Sade ("Infamies of the Marquis de Sade") on posters and lobby cards, after legal action by the present-day Sade family.

References

External links
 The Skull at the Internet Movie Database
 

1965 films
1965 horror films
British horror films
Amicus Productions films
Films based on short fiction
Films about the Marquis de Sade
Films directed by Freddie Francis
Films scored by Elisabeth Lutyens
Films based on works by Robert Bloch
Films with screenplays by Robert Bloch
Phrenology
1960s English-language films
1960s British films